This is an incomplete list of the oil paintings of J. M. W. Turner (23 April 1775 – 19 December 1851), a master noted for his skill in the portrayal of light, and in the painting of maritime scenes.

Timeline 

 1787–1801 Student
 1802–1818 Academician 
 1819–1835 Extensive wanderer
 1836–1851 Modernism

Paintings by Turner 
This list includes paintings attributed to Turner.

In substitute of specific knowledge on the date of a painting's creation (in cases where this is not known), the year of exhibition has been put, is it would likely correlate.

1787–1801 Student

1802–1818 Academician

1819–1835 Extensive wanderer

1836-1851 Modernism

References 

Lists of works of art
 
Turner